Naphthenic acids (NAs) are a mixture of several cyclopentyl and cyclohexyl carboxylic acids with molecular weight of 120 to well over 700 atomic mass units. The main fraction are carboxylic acids with a carbon backbone of 9 to 20 carbons. McKee et al. claim that "naphthenic acids (NAs) are primarily cycloaliphatic carboxylic acids with 10 to 16 carbons"[1], although acids containing up to 50 carbons have been identified in heavy petroleum. The term naphthenic acid has roots in the somewhat archaic term "naphthene" (cycloaliphatic but non-aromatic) used to classify hydrocarbons. It was originally used to describe the complex mixture of petroleum-based acids when the analytical methods available in the early 1900s could identify only a few naphthene-type components with accuracy. Today "naphthenic" acid is used in a more generic sense to refer to all of the carboxylic acids present in petroleum, whether cyclic, acyclic, or aromatic compounds, and carboxylic acids containing heteroatoms such as N and S. Although commercial naphthenic acids often contain a majority of cycloaliphatic acids, multiple studies have shown they also contain straight chain and branched aliphatic acids and aromatic acids; some naphthenic acids contain >50% combined aliphatic and aromatic acids.

Naphthenic acids are represented by a general formula CnH2n-z O2, where n indicates the carbon number and z specifies a homologous series. The z is equal to 0 for saturated, acyclic acids and increases to 2 in monocyclic naphthenic acids, to 4 in bicyclic naphthenic acids, to 6 in tricyclic acids, and to 8 in tetracyclic acids.

Salts of naphthenic acids, called naphthenates, are widely used as hydrophobic sources of metal ions in diverse applications.[2]

Sources and occurrence
The nature, occurrence, recovery and commercial uses of naphthenic acid have been reviewed. Crude oils from fields in Romania, Russia, Venezuela, the North Sea, China, and West Africa are known to be high in acidic compounds as compared to most American crude oils. The carboxylic acid content of certain California crude oils is particularly high (up to 4%)  where the most abundant classes of carboxylic acids are reported to be cycloaliphatic and aromatic acids.

The composition varies with the crude oil composition and the conditions during refining and oxidation.[3] Fractions that are rich in naphthenic acids can cause corrosion damage to oil refinery equipment; the phenomenon of naphthenic acid corrosion (NAC) has therefore been well researched.[4][5] Crude oils with a high content of naphthenic acids are often referred to as high total acid number (TAN) crude oils or high acid crude oil (HAC). Naphthenic acids are the major contaminant in water produced from the extraction of oil from Athabasca oil sands (AOS).[6] Naphthenic acids have both acute and chronic toxicity to fish and other organisms.[6]

In their oft-cited article published in Toxicological Sciences Rogers et al. stated that "naphthenic acids are the most significant environmental contaminants resulting from petroleum extraction from oil sands deposits." They found that "under worst-case exposure conditions, acute toxicity is unlikely in wild mammals exposed to naphthenic acids in AOS tailings pond water, but repeated exposure may have adverse health effects."[7] In their 2002 article cited over 100 times, Rogers et al. reported on a solvent-based laboratory bench procedure developed to "efficiently extract naphthenic acids from bulk volumes of Athabasca oil sands tailings pond water (TPW)."[8] Naphthenic acids are present in AOS tailings pond water (TPW) at an estimated concentration of 81 mg/L, too low a level for TPW to be considered a viable source for commercial recovery.

Using Organisation for Economic Co-operation and Development [OECD] protocols for testing toxicity, McKee et al. (2014) argued that based on their studies refined NAs when consumed orally were not acutely genotoxic to mammals.[1] However, damage induced by NAs while transient in acute or discontinuous exposure, may be cumulative in repeated exposure.[7]

Metal naphthenates
Naphthenic acid is removed from petroleum fractions not only to minimize corrosion but also to recover commercially useful products. The greatest current and historical usage of naphthenic acid is in metal naphthenates. Naphthenic acids are recovered from petroleum distillates by alkaline extraction and then regenerated via an acidic neutralization process and then distilled to remove impurities. Naphthenic acids sold commercially are categorized by acid number, impurity level, and color, and used to produce metal naphthenates and other derivatives such as esters and amides.

Naphthenates are the salts of naphthenic acids, analogous to the corresponding acetates, which are better defined structurally (because they crystallize readily). Such well-defined species however exhibit low solubility in hydrophobic medias such as paints. They are generally assumed have the formula M(naphthenate)2 or are basic oxides with the formula M3O(naphthenate)6. The naphthenates have industrial applications including synthetic detergents, lubricants, corrosion inhibitors, fuel and lubricating oil additives, wood preservatives, insecticides, fungicides, acaricides, wetting agents, thickening agent of napalm and oil drying agents used in painting and wood surface treatment. Industrially useful naphthenates include those of aluminium, magnesium, calcium, barium, cobalt, copper, lead, manganese, nickel, vanadium, and zinc.[2] Illustrative is the use of cobalt naphthenate for the oxidation of tetrahydronaphthalene to the hydroperoxide.

Safety
One oft-cited study stated that "naphthenic acids are the most significant environmental contaminants resulting from petroleum extraction from oil sands deposits." However "under worst-case exposure conditions, acute toxicity is unlikely in wild mammals exposed to naphthenic acids in AOS tailings pond water, but repeated exposure may have adverse health effects." Naphthenic acids are present in Athabasca oil sands (AOS) tailings pond water (TPW) at an estimated concentration of 81 mg/L.

Using Organisation for Economic Co-operation and Development (OECD) protocols for testing toxicity, McKee et al. (2014) argued that based on their studies refined NAs when consumed orally were not acutely genotoxic to mammals. However, damage induced by NAs while transient in acute or discontinuous exposure, may be cumulative in repeated exposure.

See also
 Carboxylic acid
 Organic acid
 Resin acid
 Paraffinic

References

External links
 Article concerning refining crude oil with a high content of naphthenic acids
 Crude oils with a high content of naphthenic acids in China's refineries
 Crude oils containing naphthenic acids in the Grangemouth refinery
 Overview of naphthenic acid corrosion
 Literature survey of naphthenic acid corrosion
 Removing naphthenic acids from the crude oil
 Presentation by Nalco on naphthenic acid corrosion
 Presentation by Baker Petrolite on naphthenic acid corrosion
 Presentation by ChevronTexaco on crude oils with a high content of naphthenic acids
 Information by Seth Laboratories on Naphthenic acid corrosion
 Details regarding Kuwaitian heavy crudes and naphthenic acid corrosion
 Article regarding naphthenic acid removal
 Article regarding naphthenic acid species
 Article abstract regarding molecular origins of heavy crude oil interfacial activity mainly caused by Naphthenic acids
 Article about processes to remove Naphthenic acids
 Article about stabilisation of water-in-oil emulsions by naphthenic acids
 Spectrometric Identification of Naphthenic Acids Isolated from Crude Oil
 Hydrogen flux and naphthenic acid corrosion

Petroleum products
Carboxylic acids
Cyclopentanes